The 2011 Commodore Cup National Series is an Australian motor racing series. It is the 18th running of the Commodore Cup and runs on the Shannons Nationals Motor Racing Championships calendar. The series began on 3 April 2011, at Wakefield Park and will end on 6 November 2011, at Phillip Island. For the first time, two two-driver endurance rounds will be held during the season; the traditional Ashley Cooper Memorial round at Winton and a new endurance round at the Bathurst Motor Festival.

Tony Bates won the opening round of the season despite nearly failing to make it to the race one starting grid. Ross McGregor and Fujitsu V8 Supercar driver Drew Russell won the first of the two-driver rounds at Bathurst after the pole-sitting car of five-time champion Geoff Emery and V8 Supercar driver Steve Owen encountered mechanical dramas in the first race. Reigning Ashley Cooper Memorial winners Adam Beechey and Dean Crosswell successfully defended their title at Winton, with reigning Commodore Cup champion Beechey taking the championship lead. Beechey won again at Eastern Creek before finishing off the podium for the first time in Commodore Cup at Sandown, where Matt Hayes took the round win and closed Beechey's series lead to just one point with one round remaining. Hayes took pole position at the final round to be level with Beechey on points but he was forced wide at turn two in race one which allowed Beechey ahead. Beechey went on to win the round, securing his second Commodore Cup title in as many years.

Teams and drivers
The following drivers and teams competed in the 2011 Commodore Cup National Series.

* practiced only

Calendar
The 2011 Commodore Cup National Series will consist of six rounds. Two-driver endurance rounds will be held at Bathurst and Winton.

Series standings

References

Commodore Cup
Commodore Cup